John Stretch may refer to:

 Jack Stretch, bishop
John Stretch (MP) for Devon (UK Parliament constituency)
John Stretch (badminton)